Marxist film theory is an approach to film theory centered on concepts that make possible a political understanding of the medium.

Overview 
Sergei Eisenstein and many other Soviet filmmakers in the 1920s expressed ideas of Marxism through film. In fact, the Hegelian dialectic was considered best displayed in film editing through the Kuleshov Experiment and the development of montage.

While this structuralist approach to Marxism and filmmaking was used, the more vociferous complaint that the Russian filmmakers had was with the narrative structure of the cinema of the United States.

Eisenstein's solution was to shun narrative structure by eliminating the individual protagonist and tell stories where the action is moved by the group and the story is told through a clash of one image against the next (whether in composition, motion, or idea) so that the audience is never lulled into believing that they are watching something that has not been worked over.

Eisenstein himself, however, was accused by the Soviet authorities under Joseph Stalin of "formalist error", of highlighting form as a thing of beauty instead of portraying the worker nobly.

French Marxist film makers, such as Jean-Luc Godard, would employ radical editing and choice of subject matter as well as subversive parody to heighten class consciousness and promote Marxist ideas.

Situationist film maker Guy Debord, author of The Society of the Spectacle, began his film In girum imus nocte et consumimur igni with a radical critique of the spectator who goes to the cinema to forget about their dispossessed daily life.

Situationist film makers produced a number of important films, where the only contribution by the situationist film cooperative was the sound-track.  In Can dialectics break bricks? (1973), a Chinese Kung Fu film was transformed by redubbing into an epistle on state capitalism and Proletarian revolution. The intellectual technique of using capitalism's own structures against itself is known as détournement. 

Marxist film theory has developed from these precise and historical beginnings and is now sometimes viewed in a wider way to refer to any power relationships or structures within a moving image text.

See also 
 Karl Marx in film
 Screen theory, a Marxist-psychoanalytic film theory associated with the British journal Screen in the 1970s

References

Sources 
 Observations on the English translation of Guy Debord's Oeuvres Cinématographiques Completes

Marxism
Film theory